Agustín Pascual González  (20 March 1818 – 23 January 1884) was a Spanish politician and forest engineer.

Career 
He was trained as a forest engineer in Saxony (at the Royal Saxon Academy of Forestry), where he learned from Heinrich Cotta. In 1848 he was the founder, and professor, of the Escuela de Montes de Villaviciosa de Odón. Here he was a colleague of the professor and forestry engineer Miguel Bosch. Among his students were figures like Máximo Laguna.

From 1845 to 1868, he was responsible for the management of forests of the Royal House of Spain, among which were forested areas such as Monte de El Pardo and Casa de Campo. In 1854, he was appointed member of the royal council of agriculture, industry and commerce. He was director of the Real Sociedad Económica Matritense de Amigos del País and member of the Senate.

Honors
He was an academic at the Royal Spanish Academy between 1871 and 1884.

Major works
 El bosque de Tharand, 1863.

References

1818 births
1884 deaths
People from Madrid
Forestry academics